Hilchenbach is a town in the Siegen-Wittgenstein Kreis (district) of North Rhine-Westphalia, Germany.

Geography

Location
The town borders in the south on Netphen, in the west on Kreuztal, in the north on Kirchhundem and in the east on Erndtebrück.

Geology
The town's largest flowing body of water is the Ferndorfbach, a tributary to the river Sieg.

Constituent communities

The town is made up of the following centres: Allenbach, Dahlbruch, Grund, Hadem, Helberhausen, (Alt-)Hilchenbach (alt means "old"), Lützel, Müsen, Oberndorf, Oechelhausen, Ruckersfeld and Vormwald. The recent political unit of Hilchenbach was founded in 1969.

History
The town of Hilchenbach was first mentioned in documents in 1292, when it went by the name Heylichinbach in a donation document from Countess Agnes von Nassau and her eldest son Heinrich to the Keppel Monastery. There are however clues that a church was established in this area sometime between 950 and 1000 by the Corvey Monastery, implying that there was settlement there.

In a document from 20 July 1365, a "firm house" – "festes Haus" – (Wilhelmsburg) in Hilchenbach is mentioned, which from 1489 to 1622 was enfeoffed to the Wischen von Langenau noble family. A castle with a moat was mentioned in 1623. It supposedly replaced Count William of Nassau-Siegen's Ginsburg residence.

In 1687, the village of Hilchenbach was raised to Flecken – market town.

In 1689 and 1844 nearly the whole town of (Alt-)Hilchenbach was destroyed by fire.

Hilchenbach and the villages in the surrounding were a part of the former County of Nassau. During the Napoleonic Wars in 1807 it became part of the Kingdom of Westphalia. In 1815 after the Congress of Vienna Hilchenbach and other villages in the Siegerland became part of the Prussian province of Westphalia.

Politics

Town council

The town council is elected roughly every 5 years. Its composition is listed below:

Note: UWG (Unabhängige Wählergruppe) is an independent citizens' coalition.

Mayor
The mayor of Hilchenbach is Kyrillos Kaioglidis, elected in September 2020.

Coat of arms
Hilchenbach's civic coat of arms might heraldically be described thus: Azure a wolf statant or langued gules; crest: a castle with three crenellated towers argent. The arms were last approved in this form on 13 April 1970. The first version of the coat was approved in 1911 by German emperor Wilhelm II.

The wolf charge refers to the charge in preserved examples of the old Hilchenbach jurymen's seal, which had the circumscription "S. der scheffen von helchenbach" ("S" stood for Siegel – seal – and the rest is archaic German for der Schöffen von Hilchenbach – of the Jurymen of Hilchenbach), and which appears on documents from 6 October 1477 and 17 November 1485.

Town partnerships
The town of Hilchenbach maintains town friendship links with the following places:
  Arendsee in the Altmark, Saxony-Anhalt
  Seiffen, a spa town in the Erzgebirge, Saxony

Culture and sightseeing

Theatre
In the constituent community of Dahlbruch is found the Viktoriakino, a cinema also used as a theatre. Viktoria Filmtheater

Museums
At the mining museum in Müsen, the finds from digs in the Altenberg area are on display. Furthermore, there is a mining gallery for visitors.

Buildings

Ginsburg

The Ginsburg, lying high above the constituent community of Grund was mentioned in 1255 as a Nassau border fortification. The castle achieved historic importance in 1568 when William I of Orange-Nassau drafted plans to free the Netherlands at the castle, also making final preparations for the campaign there. On the Ginsburg Heath was the meeting point for the third army group under Count Ludwig von Nassau, making the Ginsburg, and thereby also Hilchenbach, into a starting point for the Dutch struggle for freedom. Nowadays, only the castle's keep is still fully preserved, the rest of the complex lying in ruins.

Keppel Convent
This convent from 1239 was documented by a Sir Frederick (Ritter Friedrich). After the Reformation, Keppel became a noble convent. A Gymnasium is today housed in the buildings. Elsewhere in Hilchenbach was, from 1867, a teachers' college, which lasted until after the First World War. Later, the Jung-Stilling-Gymnasium was housed in the college's old building. Hilchenbach is thereby the town with the second longest – after Siegen – education tradition in the Siegerland.

Breitenbachtalsperre
Between the constituent communities of Dahlbruch and Allenbach lies the Breitenbachtalsperre, or Breitenbach Dam, which furnishes a water supply to the Siegerland. For the hiker, there are many trails here to choose from.

Natural monuments

Altenberg
At the Altenberg between the constituent community of Müsen and Kreuztal-Littfeld are found the remains of a settlement from the 13th century. A hiking trail leads through this former mining settlement. Archaeological finds are on display at the mining museum in Müsen.

Owing to their prominence in mining history documentation, a great number of finds have been taken up by the German Mining Museum in Bochum. Exhibited to the visitor there, around a complete coalpit display and with the help of the museum finds, is the mediaeval miners' way of life.

Regular events

 KulturPur – international tent theatre festival at Whitsun on the "Giller" (local heath) in Grund.

Economy and infrastructure

Transport
The main transport connections are in the east-west direction by Federal Highway (Bundesstraße) B 508 and the Rothaar Railway from Kreuztal to Erndtebrück. The South Westphalia Transport Community (Verkehrsgemeinschaft Westfalen-Süd; VGWS) runs buslines connecting the town with neighbouring communities. Hilchenbach can furthermore also be reached through the Siegerland Airport (Siegerlandflughafen) in the south of the district.

Established businesses
Hilchenbach has a specialized neurological clinic offering neuropsychology, psychotherapy, speech therapy, physiotherapy, occupational therapy, music and art therapy, rehabilitative therapy, social counselling and nutritional and dietary counselling.

Personalities

Honorary citizens
 Wilhelm Münker (1874–1970), conservationist and cofounder of the German Youth Hostel Association (Deutsches Jugendherbergswerk; DJH).

Sons and daughters of the town
 Johann Heinrich Jung (known as Jung-Stilling) (born 12 September 1740 in Grund; died 2 April 1817 in Karlsruhe), taylor, teacher, eye specialist, economist (kameralist), writer, consultant of the Count of Baden.  
 Carl Kraemer (1873–1951), animal welfare proponent
 Ulf Weiß-Vogtmann (1900–1989), inventor of the ejector seat
 Robert Ochsenfeld (born 18 May 1901 in Hilchenbach-Helberhausen; died 5 December 1993 in Hilchenbach-Helberhausen), German physicist

 Moritz Ophaus (born 1995 in Hadem), known as 'The chosen one', molecular biologist, original inventor of the Figet Spinner

Literature
 Rainer S. Elkar: Menschen-Häuser-Schicksale. Hilchenbach zwischen Monarchie, Diktatur und Republik. Kreuztal 1992.

References

External links

  
 Private website about Hilchenbach 
 Hilchenbach history and timelines 
 Private website about Müsen 
 Eintracht Chöre Helberhausen ("Harmony Choirs") 
 Heimatverein Helberhausen-Oberndorf ("Historic and Tradition Club of Helberhausen") 
 Bärengruppe Helberhausen ("Bear Group" that scares evil spirits away on New Year's Day) 
 Neurological clinic 
 Reptiles Rescue Station 

Towns in North Rhine-Westphalia
Siegen-Wittgenstein